is a waterfall on the Tanzawa River in Yamakita, Ashigarakami District Kanagawa Prefecture, Japan.

The Shasui Falls is located in the precincts of Saishō-ji, a Buddhist temple, and has been used by yamabushi and Buddhist clergy for takegyo purification ceremonies, where participants stand underneath the fall, allowing the water to strike their head and upper body.

The Shasui Falls drops in three separate plunges with a total height of 90 meters. The upper falls has a height of 69 meters, the middle falls has a height of 16 meters and the lower has a height of 29 meters. During the early Kamakura period, the famed monk Mongaku is said to have spent one hundred days in meditation and austerities at this waterfall, and the temple of Saishō-ji has an image of Fudo Myoo called the "Waterfall Fudō", which it attributes to Mongaku.

The Shasui Falls is listed as one of  "Japan’s Top 100 Waterfalls", in a list published by the Japanese Ministry of the Environment in 1990.  It is also one of the “50 Scenic Spots of Kanagawa Prefecture” in  a 1979 listing published by the Kanagawa Prefecture Tourism Association.

External links
Yamakita Town homepage
Global Waters
Kanagawa Tourism Association
  Ministry of Environment

Waterfalls of Japan
Landforms of Kanagawa Prefecture
Tourist attractions in Kanagawa Prefecture
Yamakita, Kanagawa